This is a list of football (soccer) clubs in Antigua and Barbuda.

Cingular Wireless Premier Division

 Bassa
 Hoppers
 Parham
 Sap
 Empire
 Villa Lions
 Freemansville
 All Saints United
 Potters
 Liberta
 Grenades

Antigua and Barbuda
Football clubs
 

Football clubs